Extensimonas is a Gram-negative, neutrophilic and non-spore-forming genus of bacteria from the family of Comamonadaceae with one known species (Extensimonas vulgaris). Extensimonas vulgaris has been isolated from industrial wastewater from Xiaoshan in China.

References

Comamonadaceae
Bacteria genera
Monotypic bacteria genera